Long Branch is a beachside city in Monmouth County, in the U.S. state of New Jersey. As of the 2020 United States census, the city's population was 31,667, an increase of 948 (+3.1%) from the 2010 census count of 30,719, which in turn reflected a decline of 621 (−2.0%) from the 31,340 counted in the 2000 census. As of the 2010 census, it was the 6th-most-populous municipality in Monmouth County and had the 71st-highest population of any municipality in New Jersey.

Long Branch was formed on April 11, 1867, as the Long Branch Commission, from portions of Ocean Township. Long Branch was incorporated as a city by an act of the New Jersey Legislature on April 8, 1903, based on the results of a referendum, replacing the Long Branch Commission.

History

Long Branch emerged as a beach resort town in the late 18th century, named for its location along a branch of the South Shrewsbury River. In the 19th century, theatrical performers of the day often gathered and performed there. It was visited by presidents Chester A. Arthur, James A. Garfield, Ulysses S. Grant, Benjamin Harrison, Rutherford B. Hayes, William McKinley, Woodrow Wilson, and Donald Trump. Seven Presidents Park, a park near the beach, is named in honor of the visits of the first seven of these presidents. The Church of the Presidents, where these same seven presidents worshiped, is the only structure left in Long Branch associated with them.

President Grant and his family summered at their beachfront cottage in Long Branch the first year of his presidency in 1869 and for most of the rest of Grant's life. During this time, Long Branch came to be called the "summer capital". President James A. Garfield was brought to Long Branch in the hope that the fresh air and quiet might aid his recovery after being shot on July 2, 1881, an incident that left the assassin's bullet lodged in his spine. He died here on September 19, 1881, exactly two months before his 50th birthday. The Garfield Tea House, constructed from railroad ties that had been laid to carry Garfield's train, is in Elberon.

The famous Long Branch Saloon of the American Old West, located in Dodge City, Kansas, was given its name by its first owner, William Harris, who had moved west from Long Branch, New Jersey, his hometown.

Originally a resort town with a few hotels and large estates and many farms in the early 20th century, Long Branch grew in population. Italian, Irish and Jewish immigrants settled in during this period. During the 1930s, the city used government policies to enforce racial segregation against Blacks at local beaches, assigning all black applicants for beach passes to a single, segregated beach.

By the 1950s, Long Branch like many other towns had developed new residential spots and housing to make room for the growing population. Many of the former farms of Long Branch were transformed into residential suburbs. Many of the estates and a few old historic resorts (with the addition of many new ones) still remain.

In the early 20th century, Long Branch lost much of its activity as a theater spot. In addition, the opening of the Garden State Parkway in the mid-1950s allowed shore visitors to access points further south, which added to Long Branch's decline. The civil unrest of the 1960s caused riots in neighboring Asbury Park, and many fled the shore cities for the suburban towns west of the beach. Decades later, the older, more dilapidated parts of the resort town were condemned and redeveloped, in part by using eminent domain legislation.

Long Branch still continues to be a popular resort area. Many people from New York City travel or settle into the area to escape the crowded city and enjoy Long Branch's beaches.

Hurricane Sandy
On October 29, 2012, Long Branch was one of many shore communities that were devastated by Hurricane Sandy. Although Sandy's winds were powerful, Long Branch's position between Long Beach Island and Sea Bright gave Long Branch a much larger wall of security because it could not be engulfed by surrounding waters. Despite this mainland advantage, there were still several instances of flooding in Long Branch during the storm. Many residents went without electricity for as long as two weeks. The boardwalk was destroyed; the city began rebuilding it in 2015, and it reopened in April 2016, making it the last boardwalk damaged by Sandy to be rebuilt.

Geography
Long Branch takes its name from the "long branch" or south branch of the Shrewsbury River.

According to the U.S. Census Bureau, the city had a total area of 6.29 square miles (16.28 km2), including 5.12 square miles (13.27 km2) of land and 1.16 square miles (3.01 km2) of water (18.49%).

The city borders the Monmouth County communities of Deal, Monmouth Beach, Ocean Township, Oceanport and West Long Branch.

Neighborhoods

There are several distinct neighborhoods and areas in the City of Long Branch, each with its own character. Unincorporated communities, localities and place names located partially or completely within the city include Branchport, East Long Branch, Elberon (served as ZIP Code 07740), Hollywood, Kensington Park, North Long Branch, Pleasure Bay and West End. Other areas include North End (once known as "Atlanticville"), Beachfront North and South (including Pier Village, adjacent to the site of the former Long Branch Pier at the foot of Laird Street), Downtown and Uptown. As the city's redevelopment initiatives continue to expand, the lower Broadway area (a portion of the city's Downtown) will become an Arts District.

In years past, Long Branch was a major destination for beachgoers, along with Asbury Park, and enjoyed an upscale connotation with tourists. Long Branch is home to Seven Presidents Oceanfront Park, named for the United States presidents who visited the fashionable resort town, including Ulysses S. Grant, Chester A. Arthur, Rutherford Hayes, Benjamin Harrison, William McKinley, Woodrow Wilson and James Garfield.

Long Branch's fame as the Nation's First Seaside Resort waned in the years following World War II. The defining moment marking the end of this era occurred on June 8, 1987, when the largest fire in the history of the city destroyed the landmark amusement pier and adjoining Haunted Mansion, "Kid's World" Amusement Park and other businesses.

Climate
According to the Köppen climate classification system, Long Branch has a humid subtropical climate (Cfa). Cfa climates are characterized by all months having an average temperature > , at least four months with an average temperature ≥ , at least one month with an average temperature ≥  and no significant precipitation difference between seasons. Although most summer days are slightly humid with a cooling afternoon sea breeze in Long Branch, episodes of heat and high humidity can occur with heat index values > . July is the peak in thunderstorm activity and the average wettest month is August. Episodes of extreme cold and wind can occur with wind chill values < .

Ecology
According to the A. W. Kuchler U.S. potential natural vegetation types, Long Branch would have a dominant vegetation type of Appalachian oak (104) with a dominant vegetation form of Eastern Hardwood Forest (25). The average date of first spring leaf-out is March 23 and fall color typically peaks in early-November.

Economy
Portions of the city are part of a joint Urban Enterprise Zone (UEZ) with Asbury Park, one of 32 zones covering 37 municipalities statewide. The city was selected in 1994 as one of a group of 10 zones added to participate in the program. In addition to other benefits to encourage employment and investment within the UEZ, shoppers can take advantage of a reduced 3.3125% sales tax rate (half of the % rate charged statewide) at eligible merchants. Established in November 1994, the city's Urban Enterprise Zone status expires in November 2025.

Development
Broadway Center is a planned entertainment and commercial hub of Long Branch, as envisioned by the City Government and Thompson Design Group, who created the Master Plan for the city. This complex is planned to offer retail shops, cafes, bars, restaurants and two performing arts theaters as well as 500 new residences sitting atop a 1,500 car parking garage. It will be designed by the architectural firms of Hellmuth, Obata and Kassabaum (HOK).

In June 2013, the city approved designation of the area around its train station as a transit village, which can bring incentives for revitalization and denser development.

There are several mid-rise buildings lining the oceanfront. In December 2013 another 12-story residential project was approved.

Demographics

2010 census

The Census Bureau's 2006–2010 American Community Survey showed that (in 2010 inflation-adjusted dollars) median household income was $52,792 (with a margin of error of +/− $2,549) and the median family income was $56,778 (+/− $4,202). Males had a median income of $36,404 (+/− $3,363) versus $33,397 (+/− $4,036) for females. The per capita income for the borough was $30,381 (+/− $2,212). About 11.5% of families and 14.5% of the population were below the poverty line, including 26.7% of those under age 18 and 9.6% of those age 65 or over.

2000 census
As of the 2000 United States census there were 31,340 people, 12,594 households, and 7,248 families residing in the city. The population density was 6,008.6 people per square mile (2,318.1/km2). There were 13,983 housing units at an average density of 2,680.9 per square mile (1,034.3/km2). The racial makeup of the city was 68.03% White, 18.66% African American, 0.36% Native American, 1.64% Asian, 0.05% Pacific Islander, 7.08% from other races, and 4.19% from two or more races. Hispanic or Latino of any race were 20.67% of the population.

There were 12,594 households, out of which 27.0% had children under the age of 18 living with them, 36.9% were married couples living together, 15.9% had a female householder with no husband present, and 42.4% were non-families. 34.1% of all households were made up of individuals, and 10.5% had someone living alone who was 65 years of age or older. The average household size was 2.47 and the average family size was 3.19.

In the city the population was spread out, with 23.8% under the age of 18, 10.2% from 18 to 24, 32.4% from 25 to 44, 20.8% from 45 to 64, and 12.9% who were 65 years of age or older. The median age was 35 years. For every 100 females, there were 94.3 males. For every 100 females age 18 and over, there were 91.6 males.

The median income for a household in the city was $38,651, and the median income for a family was $42,825. Males had a median income of $37,383 versus $27,026 for females. The per capita income for the city was $20,532. About 13.9% of families and 16.7% of the population were below the poverty line, including 23.3% of those under age 18 and 13.3% of those age 65 or over.

Government

Local government

Long Branch is governed under the Mayor-Council (Plan A) form of municipal government under the Faulkner Act, enacted by direct petition as of July 1, 1966. The city is one of 71 of New Jersey's 564 municipalities that use this form of government. The governing body is comprised of the Mayor and the five-member City Council, whose members are elected at-large on a non-partisan basis in the May municipal elections to serve concurrent four-year terms of office.

, the Mayor of Long Branch is John Pallone. Members of the City Council are Dr. Mary Jane Celli, Bill Dangler, Mario Vieria, Dr. Anita Voogt and Rose Widdis. The mayor and city council members serve concurrent terms of office ending on June 30, 2022.

Federal, state, and county representation
Long Branch is located in the 6th Congressional District and is part of New Jersey's 11th state legislative district.

 

Monmouth County is governed by a Board of County Commissioners comprised of five members who are elected at-large to serve three year terms of office on a staggered basis, with either one or two seats up for election each year as part of the November general election. At an annual reorganization meeting held in the beginning of January, the board selects one of its members to serve as Director and another as Deputy Director. , Monmouth County's Commissioners are
Commissioner Director Thomas A. Arnone (R, Neptune City, term as commissioner ends December 31, 2025; term as commissioner director ends 2023), 
Commissioner Deputy Director Dominick "Nick" DiRocco (R, Wall Township, term as commissioner ends December 31, 2025; term as deputy commissioner director ends 2023),
Lillian G. Burry (R, Colts Neck Township, 2023), Susan M. Kiley (R, Hazlet Township, 2024), and Ross F. Licitra (R, Marlboro Township, 2023). Constitutional officers elected on a countywide basis are County clerk Christine Giordano Hanlon (R, 2025; Ocean Township), 
Sheriff Shaun Golden (R, 2022; Howell Township), and Surrogate Maureen T. Raisch (R, 2026; Middletown Township).

Politics
As of March 2011, there were a total of 13,442 registered voters in Long Branch, of which 4,293 (31.9%) were registered as Democrats, 1,783 (13.3%) were registered as Republicans and 7,358 (54.7%) were registered as Unaffiliated. There were 8 voters registered as Libertarians or Greens.

In the 2012 presidential election, Democrat Barack Obama received 64.5% of the vote (5,421 cast), ahead of Republican Mitt Romney with 34.5% (2,897 votes), and other candidates with 1.0% (81 votes), among the 8,470 ballots cast by the city's 14,289 registered voters (71 ballots were spoiled), for a turnout of 59.3%. In the 2008 presidential election, Democrat Barack Obama received 61.2% of the vote (6,171 cast), ahead of Republican John McCain with 35.7% (3,600 votes) and other candidates with 1.0% (98 votes), among the 10,090 ballots cast by the city's 14,433 registered voters, for a turnout of 69.9%. In the 2004 presidential election, Democrat John Kerry received 58.0% of the vote (5,724 ballots cast), outpolling Republican George W. Bush with 40.5% (4,001 votes) and other candidates with 0.7% (99 votes), among the 9,870 ballots cast by the city's 14,563 registered voters, for a turnout percentage of 67.8.

In the 2013 gubernatorial election, Republican Chris Christie received 57.4% of the vote (2,621 cast), ahead of Democrat Barbara Buono with 41.1% (1,876 votes), and other candidates with 1.6% (71 votes), among the 4,677 ballots cast by the city's 14,129 registered voters (109 ballots were spoiled), for a turnout of 33.1%. In the 2009 gubernatorial election, Democrat Jon Corzine received 48.1% of the vote (2,714 ballots cast), ahead of Republican Chris Christie with 44.7% (2,523 votes), Independent Chris Daggett with 5.7% (320 votes) and other candidates with 0.9% (48 votes), among the 5,645 ballots cast by the city's 13,812 registered voters, yielding a 40.9% turnout.

Public safety

The Long Branch Department of Public Safety consists of the Long Branch Police Department (LBPD), the Long Branch Fire Department, and the Office of Emergency Management. The LBPD did not have a police chief between 1970 and 2017, with the Director of Public Safety being directly responsible for the department.

On November 20, 1997, LBPD Detective Sergeant Patrick A. King was killed by gunshot while ordering at a Chinese restaurant.  The killer led law enforcement on a  chase which ended in his suicide.

Education
Long Branch's public schools are operated by the Long Branch Public Schools, serving children in pre-kindergarten through twelfth grade. The district is one of 31 former Abbott districts statewide that were established pursuant to the decision by the New Jersey Supreme Court in Abbott v. Burke which are now referred to as "SDA Districts" based on the requirement for the state to cover all costs for school building and renovation projects in these districts under the supervision of the New Jersey Schools Development Authority. All Long Branch Public Schools are free, including the district's preschool programs which are full-day and accommodate children ages 3–5 years old. Long Branch schools offer free breakfast each morning for the students. In addition, Long Branch Public Schools provide free summer programs for most of the summer.

As of the 2018–19 school year, the district, comprising eight schools, had an enrollment of 5,786 students and 477.8 classroom teachers (on an FTE basis), for a student–teacher ratio of 12.1:1. Schools in the district (with 2018–19 enrollment data from the National Center for Education Statistics) are Lenna W. Conrow School (with 380 students; in grades Pre-K–K), 
Joseph M. Ferraina Early Childhood Learning Center (314; Pre-K–K), 
Morris Avenue School (379; Pre-K–K), 
Amerigo A. Anastasia School (541; 1–5), 
George L. Catrambone Elementary School (876; K–5), 
Gregory School (552; 1–5), 
Long Branch Middle School (1,198; 6–8), 
Long Branch High School, (1,499; 9–12) and 
Audrey W. Clark School / The Academy of Alternative Programs, an alternative education program.

George L. Catrambone Elementary School was constructed at a total cost over $40 million for a facility that was designed to house 800 students in a facility covering  for which construction began in 2012. With the start of the 2014–2015 school year, a realignment of the district closed West End School, converted Morris Avenue School for early childhood use and repurposed Audrey W. Clark School for alternative education.

Seashore School is a private K–8 school, with class size limited to 16 students.

Declining attendance led the Roman Catholic Diocese of Trenton to close the K–8 Holy Trinity School in June 2006.

Media
WRLB "Radio Long Branch" signed-on June 1, 1960, at 107.1 FM. Since December 1996 the call letters have been WWZY.

Transportation

Roads and highways

Route 36 and Route 71 are the most significant highways that pass through the city.

Public transportation
Long Branch is connected to New York City and Northern New Jersey via NJ Transit trains running on the North Jersey Coast Line. The Long Branch station, located three blocks away from the beach, marks the end of electrified trackage, where passengers continuing south must change to diesel-powered trains. A second station is located at Elberon district just north of the borough of Deal. In the past there were stops in the West End neighborhood and on Broadway, but they were closed to reduce travel time to New York City.

Local bus transportation is provided by NJ Transit on the 831 and 837 routes. Transportation to New York City is provided by Academy Bus' Route 36 and Shore Points routes.

Notable people

People who were born in, residents of, or otherwise closely associated with Long Branch include:

 M. H. Abrams (1912–2015), literary critic, known for works on romanticism
 Aida de Acosta (1884–1962), socialite and the first woman to fly a powered aircraft solo
 Richard Anderson (1926–2017), best known for his role as Oscar Goldman, in both The Six Million Dollar Man and The Bionic Woman TV series and subsequent TV movies
 Paul Baerwald (1871–1961), banker and philanthropist
 Arthur Hornbui Bell (1891–1973), attorney who was the Grand Dragon of the Ku Klux Klan in New Jersey
 Joe Benning (born 1956), member of the Vermont Senate who has represented the Caledonia District since 2011
 Clint Black (born 1962), country music performer
 Jeff Blumenkrantz (born 1965), actor, composer and lyricist
 Clara Bloodgood (1870–1907), stage actress
 Dorothy Borg (1902–1993), historian specializing in American-East Asian relations
 Joe Bravo (born 1971), thoroughbred racing jockey
 MarShon Brooks (born 1989), basketball player for the Brooklyn Nets
 Frank Budd (1939–2014), wide receiver in the NFL for the Philadelphia Eagles and the Washington Redskins who once held the world record in the 100-yard dash
 John Cannon (born 1960), former defensive end who played nine seasons for the Tampa Bay Buccaneers
 Rick Cerone (born 1954), former Yankee catcher who played for eight major league baseball teams, and was part of the New York Yankees for seven years
 Jo Champa (born 1968), actress, producer and model
 June Clark (born 1900), jazz trumpeter who later managed boxer Sugar Ray Robinson
 Connor Clifton (born 1995), ice hockey defenseman for the Boston Bruins of the NHL
 Paul Cohen (1934–2007), awarded the Fields Medal for developing forcing to show the independence of the continuum hypothesis and the axiom of choice in axiomatic set theory
 James M. Coleman (1924–2014), politician who served in the New Jersey General Assembly and as a judge in New Jersey Superior Court
 Tom Constanten (born 1944), musician, former keyboardist for the Grateful Dead
 John D'Amico Jr. (born 1941), who served on the Monmouth County Board of Chosen Freeholders and served in the New Jersey Senate in 1988 and 1989
 Herbert Dardik (1935–2020), vascular surgeon who served as the chief of vascular surgery at Englewood Hospital and Medical Center
 Bob Davis (born 1945), former NFL quarterback whose career included three seasons with the New York Jets
 Sean Davis (born 1993), professional soccer player for the New York Red Bulls of Major League Soccer
 David Doubilet (born 1946), underwater photographer
 Frederick Douglass (1818–1895), lived in Long Branch for a short period of time until his home burnt down
 Barnett A. Elzas (1867–1936), rabbi and historian who served as rabbi at Beth Miriam Congregation in Long Branch
 Samuel Feltman (1899–1951), computer scientist and weaponry expert
 Mel Ferrer (1917–2008), actor, director and producer
 Joan Field (1915–1988), concert violinist
 Tom Fleming (1951–2017), distance runner who won the 1973 and 1975 New York City Marathon
 Waldo Frank (1889–1967), novelist, historian, political activist and literary critic
 James A. Garfield (1831–1881), 20th President of the United States, died in Long Branch
 David Garrison (born 1952), actor most noted for playing Steve Rhoades on Married... with Children
 Richard T. Gill (1927–2010), Harvard University economist who became an opera singer at midlife
 Vin Gopal (born 1985), politician who represents the 11th Legislative District in the New Jersey Senate
 Elizabeth Gorcey (born 1962), filmmaker, actor and writer, best known for her leading role in the 1984 film Footloose
 Sonny Greer (1895–1982), jazz drummer, best known for his work with Duke Ellington
 John Faucheraud Grimké (1752–1819), father of abolitionists Sarah Grimké and Angelina Grimké
 Sarah Moore Grimké (1792–1873), abolitionist and women's rights activist, briefly lived in Long Branch while caring for her father
 Harry Frank Guggenheim (1890–1971), businessman, diplomat, publisher, philanthropist, aviator and horseman
 Garret Hobart (1844–1899), 24th Vice President of the United States, under William McKinley
 Winslow Homer (1836–1910), stayed in Long Branch in 1869, while he produced paintings of Victorian women strolling the boardwalks
 Deborah Lee James (born 1958), 23rd Secretary of the United States Air Force
 Jim Jeffcoat (born 1961), professional football player for the Dallas Cowboys and the Buffalo Bills from 1983 to 1997
 Mamie Johnson (1935–2017), professional baseball player who was one of three women, and the first female pitcher, to play in the Negro leagues
 Ed Jones (born 1952), former defensive back for the Edmonton Eskimos of the Canadian Football League from 1976 to 1984, who won five Grey Cups for the Eskimos and was a CFL All-Star from 1979 to 1981
 Julius Katchen (1926–1969), concert pianist, best known for his recordings of Johannes Brahms's solo piano works
 Raja Feather Kelly, choreographer best known for his work on Off-Broadway shows which combine "pop and queer culture"
 Jim Kerwin (born 1941), retired basketball player and college coach
 Tom Kerwin (born 1944), professional basketball forward who played in the American Basketball Association for the Pittsburgh Pipers
 Thomas G. Labrecque (1938–2000), business executive who served as president, CEO, and COO of Chase Manhattan Bank
 Connie Lawn (1944–2018), independent broadcast journalist who, at the time of her death, was the longest-serving White House correspondent
 Sigurd Lucassen (1927–2001), carpenter and labor leader who served as president of the United Brotherhood of Carpenters and Joiners of America.
 Norman Mailer (1923–2007), novelist
 Ashley Marinaccio (born 1985), director, documentarian and actor
 Jonathan Maslow (1948–2008), author who wrote extensively about nature, with a focus on obscure and little understood animals
 Karen McCloskey (born 1951), rower who competed in the women's quadruple sculls event at the 1976 Summer Olympics
 Walter Mebane (born 1958), University of Michigan professor of political science and statistics and an expert on detecting electoral fraud
 Sam Mills (1959–2005), linebacker who played 12 seasons in the NFL for the New Orleans Saints and Carolina Panthers
 Julian Mitchell (1854–1926), director of the Ziegfeld Follies
 John Montefusco (born 1950), Major League Baseball pitcher 1974 to 1986 for the San Francisco Giants, Atlanta Braves, San Diego Padres and New York Yankees
 Denise Morrison (born 1954), business executive who served as president and chief executive officer of Campbell Soup Company from 2011 through 2018
 Frank Pallone (born 1951), member of the United States House of Representatives since 1988, who served on the Long Branch city council from 1982 to 1988
 Dorothy Parker (1893–1967), writer and storied member of the Algonquin Round Table, whose birthplace at 792 Ocean Avenue has been designated as a National Literary Landmark
 George R. Pettit (1929–2021), chemist and researcher in the field of natural anticancer compounds
 Robert Pinsky (born 1940), Poet Laureate of the United States from 1997 to 2000
 Anthony Portantino (born 1961), politician who serves in the California State Senate, where he represents the 25th Senate District
 Elizabeth Clare Prophet (1939–2009), spiritual leader, author, orator and writer.
 Brian Pulido (born 1961), founder of Chaos! Comics and writer of comics books such as Lady Death, Evil Ernie and Purgatori
 Paris Qualles (born 1951), screenwriter and television producer
 Jim Quirk (born ), NFL on-field official from 1988 to 2008
 Priscilla Ransohoff (1912–1992), military education specialist and advocate for women in science and federal employment.
 Harry Ray (born 1946), R&B vocalist who was a member of the groups "The Moments" and "Ray, Goodman, & Brown"
 Charles Rembar (1915–2000), attorney best known as a First Amendment rights lawyer
 Richie Rosenberg, trombonist who performed with Southside Johnny & The Asbury Jukes
 Jason Ryan (born 1976), pitcher who played two seasons for Minnesota Twins
 Melanie Safka (born 1947), singer-songwriter
 Adam Sarafian (born 1986), geologist who has advanced theories about the origin of water on Earth and pole vaulter who won the national championship in 2004
 Fred Schneider (born 1951), singer, songwriter, arranger and musician, best known as the frontman of the rock band the B-52's, of which he is a founding member
 Scott Schoeneweis (born 1973), a relief pitcher who played for the New York Mets, among other teams
 Rubby Sherr (1913–2013), nuclear physicist who co-invented a key component of the first nuclear weapon while participating in the Manhattan Project
John W. Slocum (1867–1938), lawyer, county judge, President of the New Jersey Senate
 Bruce Springsteen (born 1949), born in Long Branch and raised in Freehold Borough, New Jersey, wrote "Born to Run", "Thunder Road" and "Backstreets" in a cottage at 7½ West End Court
 John Strollo (born 1954), college football coach
 Danny Stubbs (born 1965), who won multiple National Championships with University of Miami and two Super Bowls with the San Francisco 49ers as a defensive tackle
 Norman Tanzman (1918–2004), politician who served in the New Jersey General Assembly from 1962 to 1968 and in the New Jersey Senate from 1968 to 1974
 Yvonne Thornton (born 1947), obstetrician-gynecologist, musician and author, best known for her memoir, The Ditchdigger's Daughters
 Meghan Tierney (born 1997), snowboarder who represented the United States at the 2018 Olympics
 Army Tomaini (1918–2005), American football tackle who played for the New York Giants in 1945
 Johnny Tomaini (1902–1985), professional football player who played in the NFL for the Orange Tornadoes, Newark Tornadoes and Brooklyn Dodgers
 Ivy Troutman (1884–1979), Broadway actress
 John Henry Turpin  (1876–1962), one of the first African-American Chief Petty Officers in the United States Navy; also notable for surviving the catastrophic explosions of the USS Maine in 1898 and USS Bennington in 1905
 Chase Untermeyer (born 1946), United States Ambassador to Qatar
 Anthony M. Villane (1929–2022), dentist and politician who was elected to serve seven terms in the New Jersey General Assembly from 1976 to 1988
 John Villapiano (born 1951), former professional football player who played in the World Football League and politician who served on the Monmouth County, New Jersey Board of chosen freeholders and the New Jersey General Assembly from 1988 to 1992
 Phil Villapiano (born 1949), former NFL linebacker who played in four Pro Bowls and was a part of the Oakland Raiders Super Bowl XI winning team
 Maggie Wilderotter (born 1955), former chief executive officer of Frontier Communications
 Constance H. Williams (born 1944), politician who served from 2001 to 2009 in the Pennsylvania State Senate
 Earl Wilson (born 1958), NFL and CFL player
 Morris Wood (1882–1967), champion speed skater during the early 1900s
 Bernie Worrell (1944–2016), keyboardist and founding member of Parliament-Funkadelic
 Mike Zapcic, podcaster and cast member of the AMC reality TV show Comic Book Men with Kevin Smith

In popular culture
 The AXS TV reality series, Bikini Barbershop, is set in Long Branch, at Bikini Barbers located on Ocean Boulevard.
 In the HBO series, The Sopranos, Long Branch is the setting for Adriana La Cerva's nightclub, the Crazy Horse (see "The Telltale Moozadell"). In the episode "The Blue Comet", the house in which Tony Soprano hides out towards the end of the series is near the beach in North Long Branch.

See also
 Long Branch Police Department
 Long Branch Public Schools
 Long Branch, Toronto

References

External links

 City of Long Branch website
 Long Branch Public Library and Children's Library
 Long Branch Chamber of Commerce

 
1903 establishments in New Jersey
Cities in Monmouth County, New Jersey
Faulkner Act (mayor–council)
Jersey Shore communities in Monmouth County
New Jersey Urban Enterprise Zones
Populated places established in 1903